Emily Bauer Jenness is an American voice and stage actress. She has worked in a number of English language dubs of Japanese anime shows including Shinobu in Ninja Nonsense, Megumi Morisato in Ah! My Goddess and Lastelle in Nausicaä of the Valley of the Wind.

Early life 
Growing up in Millburn, New Jersey, Bauer took dance, acting and singing classes at a local performing arts school and later performed in professional plays and musicals at the Paper Mill Playhouse. She attended Millburn High School and majored in both business and theatre at New York University. She graduated cum laude in 2002 and also received the Presidential Honors Scholar Award for maintaining one of the highest cumulative GPAs.

Career 
Bauer has acted in Mona Lisa Smile with Julia Roberts and Long Distance with Monica Keena. In 2005, she voiced in Nausicaä of the Valley of the Wind with Alison Lohman, Patrick Stewart and Uma Thurman. In 2007, she was cast as the lead role of Dawn and as the Sinnoh League Champion Cynthia in the Pokémon: Diamond and Pearl anime series. In 2014, Bauer voiced main character Zuzu Boyle/Ray Akaba and her counterparts in Yu-Gi-Oh! Arc-V.

Bauer has an acting studio in New Jersey and continues to participate in productions in the New York City metro area.

Personal life 
Bauer has two children, including her daughter actress Mia Sinclair Jenness.

Filmography

Audiobooks 
 Life as We Knew It
 InCryptid series
Discount Armageddon (2012)
Midnight Blue-Light Special (2013)
Chaos Cheoreography (2016)
Magic for Nothing (2017)
Tricks for Free (2018)
That Ain't Witchcraft (2019)
Imaginary Numbers (2020)
Calculated Risks (2021)
Spelunking Through Hell (2022)

Stage

References

External links 
 
  - Emily's performing arts studio in Maplewood, New Jersey
 
 
  - audio review of one of the audio books that Emily reads.

Living people
Actresses from New Jersey
American stage actresses
American video game actors
American voice actresses
Millburn High School alumni
New York University alumni
People from Millburn, New Jersey
21st-century American actresses
Place of birth missing (living people)
Year of birth missing (living people)